The Marcus King Band is a southern rock/blues band from South Carolina formed in 2013.

History 
The band is led by guitarist Marcus King. Raised in Greenville, South Carolina, King was brought up on the blues, playing shows as a pre-teen sideman with his father, the fellow bluesman Marvin King. The band includes drummer Jack Ryan, bassist Stephen Campbell, and trumpet/trombone player Justin Johnson. Touring musicians consist of saxophonist Chris Spies, and keyboard player, Dane Farnsworth of Robert Randolph and the Family Band.

The Marcus King Band released their debut album, Soul Insight on October 30, 2015 on Warren Haynes' Evil Teen Records. Soul Insight reached #8 on the Billboard Blues Albums Chart.

The band's second full-length LP and first album for Fantasy Records, The Marcus King Band, was released on October 7, 2016. The album was produced by Haynes and recorded at Carriage House Studios in Stamford, Connecticut. The Marcus King Band reached No. 2 on the Billboard Blues Albums Chart.

On August 22, 2018, it was announced the band would release their third full-length LP, Carolina Confessions, on October 5, 2018, via Fantasy Records. The album was recorded at RCA Studio A in Nashville, and produced and mixed by Dave Cobb. While not entering the Billboard 200, it was the band's first entry on the magazine's US Top Current Albums chart, peaking at No. 55, and was another No. 2 hit on the Blues chart for them. The album also reached No. 2 on the Heatseekers Albums chart.

Discography

Albums
Soul Insight (2015) No. 8 Blues Albums Chart
The Marcus King Band (2016) No. 2 Blues Albums Chart
Carolina Confessions (2018) No. 2 Blues Albums Chart

EPs
Due North EP (2017) No. 2 Blues Album Chart

Singles
"Homesick" (2018) No. 26 Adult Alternative Songs

References

External links
 
 
 Marcus sits down with Ira Haberman of The Sound Podcast for a feature interview

American blues rock musical groups
Fantasy Records artists
American southern rock musical groups
Rock music groups from South Carolina